What's My Line? is a panel game show based on the US version of the same name. It was originally aired on BBC Television Service from 16 July 1951 to 13 May 1963, hosted by Eamonn Andrews. It was revived by BBC2 from 23 August 1973 to 25 May 1974, hosted by David Jacobs, and then by ITV from 26 March 1984 to 31 August 1990. The ITV incarnation was first hosted by Eamonn Andrews from 1984 until his death in 1987, then by Penelope Keith for a part of 1988 before Angela Rippon took over until 1990. Two regional ITV stations, HTV and Meridian, revived it again from 19 September 1994 to 17 December 1996, when it was hosted by Emma Forbes.

Regular panelists on the original version were Jerry Desmonde, Gilbert Harding, David Nixon, Barbara Kelly and Isobel Barnett.

Transmissions

BBC2 era

Series

Specials

Thames era

Series

Specials

HTV/Meridian era

References

External links

1951 British television series debuts
1996 British television series endings
1950s British game shows
1960s British game shows
1970s British game shows
1980s British game shows
1990s British game shows
BBC television game shows
British panel games
British television series based on American television series
British television series revived after cancellation
English-language television shows
ITV game shows
Television shows produced by Thames Television
Television shows produced by Harlech Television (HTV)
Television shows produced by Meridian Broadcasting
Television series by Fremantle (company)